Loggieville is a Canadian suburban neighbourhood in the city of Miramichi, New Brunswick. The community is located at the mouth of the Miramichi River on the southern bank where the river estuary discharges into the bay. Named after the Loggie family who were prominent local merchants, Loggieville was an incorporated village in Northumberland County until municipal amalgamation in 1995.

History

Originally named Black Brook, the first store opened at Loggieville sometime between 1809 and 1813.
It was settled by principally by Scottish and English immigrants, although the community also has some Acadian and Irish inhabitants. The community developed into an important shipping port in the mid-1880s after the Canada Eastern Railway built its eastern terminus on the shores of Miramichi Bay.

Fishing and fish packing were prominent industries for many years.

Notable people

See also
List of neighbourhoods in Miramichi, New Brunswick

References

Neighbourhoods in Miramichi, New Brunswick
Former villages in New Brunswick
Populated places disestablished in 1995